Jonas Howden Sjøvaag (born 3 November 1978 in Munich, Germany) is a Norwegian jazz drummer.

Biography 
Sjøvaag started playing piano at an early age. He had his solo debut with Vestfold Youth Symphony Orchestra at age 11, started playing drums at age 10, and switched main focus to jazz drums at age 17. He graduated at the Norwegian Academy of Music with a Master's degree in improvised music in 2008. From 2003 he has been regular drummer of the Eple Trio.

Discography (in selection)

Solo albums 
2001: Navyelectre 1 (Shipwreckords)
2008: Navyelectre The Mourning (Shipwreckords)
2015: Navyelectre Large Ensemble (Shipwreckords)

Collaborations 
Eple Trio
2007: Made this (NorCD)
2008: The Widening Sphere Of Influence (NorCD)
2010:In The Clearing / In The Cavern (double album) (NorCD)
2014: Universal Cycle (Shipwreckords)

Kallerdahl / Seglem / Ulvo / Hole / Sjøvaag
2009: Skoddeheimen (NorCD)

Karl Seglem
2007: NorskJazz.no (Ozella Records)
2013: NyeSongar.no (Ozella Records)
2017: Nordic Balm (Ozella Records)

References

External links 

1978 births
Living people
Musicians from Oslo
20th-century Norwegian drummers
21st-century Norwegian drummers
Norwegian jazz drummers
Male drummers
Norwegian jazz composers
Avant-garde jazz musicians
Norwegian Academy of Music alumni
NorCD artists
20th-century drummers
Male jazz composers
20th-century Norwegian male musicians
21st-century Norwegian male musicians
Eple Trio members